Peter B. Ellis is the name of:

Peter Berresford Ellis (born 1943), English historian
Peter B. Ellis (film editor), film editor of The Audrey Hepburn Story and The Scoundrel's Wife
Peter B. Ellis (lawyer), a lawyer involved in the Amer Mohammon v. George W. Bush case

See also
Peter Ellis (disambiguation)